A McKenzie friend assists a litigant in person in a court of law in England and Wales, Hong Kong, Northern Ireland, the Republic of Ireland, New Zealand, Canada and Australia by prompting, taking notes, and quietly giving advice. They need not be legally trained or have any professional legal qualifications.

The right to a McKenzie friend was established in the 1970 case of McKenzie v McKenzie. Although in many cases a McKenzie friend may be an actual friend, it is often somebody with knowledge of the area and the presumption is heavily in favour of admitting a McKenzie friend into court.  He or she may be liable for any misleading advice given to the litigant in person but is not covered by professional indemnity insurance.

A similar, modified principle exists in Singapore.

Origin
McKenzie v. McKenzie was a divorce case in England.  Levine McKenzie, who was petitioning for divorce, had been legally aided but the legal aid had been withdrawn before the case went to court. Unable to fund legal representation, McKenzie had broken off contact with his solicitors, Jeffrey Gordon & Co. However, one day before the hearing, Jeffrey Gordon sent the case to an Australian barrister in London, Ian Hanger, whose qualifications in law in Australia did not allow him to practise as a barrister in London. Hanger hoped to sit with his client to prompt him, take notes and suggest questions in cross-examination, thereby providing what quiet assistance he could from the bar table to a man representing himself. The trial judge ordered Hanger not to take any active part in the case (except to advise McKenzie during adjournments) and to sit in the public gallery of the court.  Hanger assumed his limited role was futile and did not return for the second day of the trial.

The case went against McKenzie, who then appealed to the Court of Appeal on the basis that he had been denied representation. On 12 June 1970, the Court of Appeal ruled that the judge's intervention had deprived McKenzie of the assistance to which he was entitled and ordered a retrial.

As of 2022, Ian Hanger AM KC, the original McKenzie friend, is a King's Counsel (KC) at the Queensland Bar.

In specific jurisdictions

Singapore
In September 2006, the Subordinate Courts of Singapore started a pilot project called the Lay Assistant Scheme in which persons, usually with some legal knowledge, attend hearings with litigants who are not represented by lawyers to advise them on non-legal issues and help them with administrative tasks. The scheme, a modification of the UK's McKenzie friend system, is intended to assist litigants who are not eligible for legal aid as they have an annual salary exceeding S$10,000 but cannot afford a lawyer.  For the litigant to qualify, the other party must be legally represented.

Lay assistants are not allowed to act as lawyers and may not address the court; any breach of court rules may render them liable to a maximum fine of $1,000 or imprisonment of up to six months.

Plans for introducing McKenzie friends in court proceedings were first announced by Chief Justice Chan Sek Keong in May 2006.  Students from the Pro Bono Group of the Faculty of Law, National University of Singapore, have been participating in the scheme.

England and Wales
In English courts, where a case is being heard in private, the use of a McKenzie friend has sometimes been contentious. This is a particular problem in family court hearings, where it has been held that the nature of the case is so confidential that no one other than the litigants and their professional legal representatives should be admitted to the court.

A 2005 Court of Appeal case, In the matter of the children of Mr O'Connell, Mr Whelan and Mr Watson, clarified the law in this area. The result of the appeal has legitimised the use of McKenzie friends in the family court and allowed the litigant to disclose confidential court papers to the McKenzie friend.

England and Wales allow fee charging McKenzie friends, who may charge for their services, including the giving of legal advice.  A recent report by the Legal Service Consumer Panel found that fee charging McKenzie friends were a net benefit.  The report stated, "They should be viewed as providing valuable support that improves access to justice in the large majority of cases."

Scotland
The legal system in England and Wales differs from that in Scotland. The first recorded use of McKenzie friends in Scotland was in April 2007 in the case TB & AM v The Authority Reporter. The one major difference between England and Scotland is that in Scotland McKenzie friends are not permitted to receive remuneration.

See also
 Duty solicitor
 Support Through Court
 Legal advisor

References

Legal terminology
Region-specific legal occupations
Courts of England and Wales
Common law
Family law
Friendship